The Methodist Church of Southern Africa (MCSA) is a large Wesleyan Methodist denomination, with local churches across South Africa, Namibia, Botswana, Lesotho and Eswatini, and a more limited presence in Mozambique. It is a member church of the World Methodist Council.

The church is the largest mainline Protestant denomination in South Africa – 7.3% of the South African population recorded their religious affiliation as 'Methodist' in the last national census. The denomination has nearly 2 million members.

History
Methodism in Southern Africa began as a result of lay Christian work by an Irish soldier of the English Regiment, John Irwin, who was stationed at the Cape and began to hold prayer meetings as early as 1795. The first Methodist lay preacher at the Cape, George Middlemiss, was a soldier of the 72nd regiment of the British Army stationed at the Cape in 1805. This foundation paved the way for missionary work by Methodist missionary societies from Great Britain, many of whom sent missionaries with the 1820 English settlers to the Western and Eastern Cape. Among the most notable of the early missionaries were Barnabas Shaw and William Shaw. The largest group was the Wesleyan Methodist Church, but there were a number of others that joined together to form the Methodist Church of South Africa, later known as the Methodist Church of Southern Africa to reflect its cross-border mission.

The MCSA rejected the apartheid ideology from the beginning and was a vocal critic of the Nationalist government policy throughout the apartheid era. A notable politician with Methodist roots was Nelson Mandela, who addressed the annual conference in a 1994, praising the work of the church throughout the era of minority-rule.

Faced by government pressure to divide along racial lines, the 1958 conference declared its "conviction that it is the will of God for the Methodist Church that it should be one and undivided, trusting to the leading of God to bring this ideal to ultimate fruition". Six years later the first African to serve as president of conference was elected. The life of the MCSA reflects the strains and tensions of an apartheid society. In spite of this, the conference, connexional executive and synods have long since been non-racial. The idea of a one and undivided church has still to be realized at the congregational level.

Gender and sexuality
On issues of gender and human sexuality, the denomination is more liberal than other denominations in African countries. For example, the church has allowed and supported the ordination of women in ministry. In 2019 the Methodist Church of Southern Africa inducted Purity Nomthandazo Malinga as its presiding bishop, making her the first woman to serve in the most senior role in the church. She was also the first woman consecrated as a synodal bishop in 1999.

Additionally, the denomination has opposed discrimination against members of the gay and lesbian community. In particular, the denomination opposed the anti-gay legislation being proposed in Uganda. In 2013, the denomination announced that it was in the midst of conversation regarding how to approach same-sex relationships. Currently, “Conference recognises that any decision and subsequent action on the issue of civil unions between same sex partners must await the outcome of the on-going process of engagement as specified by Conference 2005 and, in the interim, expects Methodist Ministers to continue to offer pastoral care to homosexual individuals."

In a case concerning a married lesbian pastor, the Western Cape High Court determined that "the Methodist church did not have a rule prohibiting its ministers from marrying someone of the same sex". Additionally, another court determined that the denomination "even accepts same-sex relationships (as long as such relationships are not solemnised by marriage), which means it is not at the core of the Church’s beliefs". At the Constitutional Court, the Church said that "it tolerates homosexual relationships but requires its ministers not to enter into same-sex marriages." Regarding a specific case involving a lesbian minister, the MCSA "allowed her to be in a homosexual relationship whilst being a minister, and allowed her to stay in the Church’s manse with her partner, but drew the line at recognising her same-sex marriage". In 2016, the Rev Londiwe Zulu, an openly lesbian Methodist pastor, participated in a panel on human sexuality. In 2020, the MCSA decided that all members, including ordained clergy, are permitted to enter into a same-gender civil union, while retaining the denomination's teaching that marriage is a union "between a man and a woman".

Community leadership
Peter J. Harley, born 24 November 1931 in Acres Goodwood, Cape Town, is the longest serving Local Preacher in the Cape of Good Hope District. Renowned throughout for the futuristic type of youth programs which today is the norm, teaching young people in disadvantaged areas about terms such as organograms, resource, co-ordinator, liaison, scrounger as far back as 1969, way ahead of its time.

From 1969 through 1974 they drew up to 450 of the youth in the area, unfailingly attending its activities week by week. An outspoken and challenging local preacher, the preached word more often than not sending parishioners home with much food for thought as the unadulterated word is preached as a pure Methodist. The originator of many Bible Study groups throughout the Peninsula of which some are still in operation. Many young people originally from that group have advanced to become leaders in various fields with much thanks and gratefulness to the commitment and dedication of Peter Harley for the spreading of the Gospel and above all: teaching others to teach.

Structure
The church is connexional and organised along episcopal lines. The MCSA operates today across six countries in Southern Africa. The organisation as a whole is referred to as a "Connexion", which in turn is made up of 12 Districts:

Limpopo
Cape of Good Hope
Central
Highveld and Swaziland
Natal Coastal
Natal West
Grahamstown
Clarkebury
Kimberley, Namibia & Bloemfontein
Northern Free State & Lesotho
Queenstown
Mocambique
Botswana

Representatives from across the Connexion meet together every year at an annual Conference, as is Methodist tradition. The Conference elects a "presiding bishop", who acts as the leader of the Connexion as a whole. Each district is led by a bishop and a District Executive, with the main decision-making body at a district level being the annual synod. 

At a local level are the circuits, consisting of a number of church congregations, known as "societies" (modelled on the early Methodist societies). The circuits, of which there are hundreds, are grouped into districts.

References

External links

The official website of The Methodist Church of Southern Africa

Methodist denominations
Protestantism in Africa
Members of the World Council of Churches